Hatem Trabelsi (born 25 January 1977) is a Tunisian former professional footballer who played as a right-back for CS Sfaxien, Ajax, Manchester City and Al-Hilal Riyadh. At international level, he represented the Tunisia national team in three World Cups, gaining a total of 66 caps before retiring from international football in 2006.

Club career
Born in Ariana, Tunisia, Trabelsi grew up in Sfax, and started his football career with his home town club Sfaxien, where he initially played as a forward. An injury crisis at Sfaxien resulted in Trabelsi playing as a stop-gap right-back, leading to him converting to defence and becoming the team's regular right-back. In 2001 Trabelsi moved to Europe, signing for Dutch club Ajax.

During the pre season of 2004, he was given a trial period at Arsenal by Arsène Wenger. A fee between Ajax and the English champions was agreed. With the transfer looking imminent, even Pro Evolution Soccer 4 included Trabelsi for Arsenal. However, after disagreements over Trabelsi's salary demands were reported, Trabelsi did not sign with Arsenal and soon returned home to Ajax.

In 2006 Trabelsi was linked with moves to several English clubs, and joined Manchester City on a free transfer on 10 August. Injury and work permit problems prevented him from making his debut until a month into the season, a substitute appearance against Reading on 11 September.

He scored his first Manchester City goal against Manchester United with a left foot shot to beat Edwin van der Sar. Manchester City still lost the game 3–1. Trabelsi lost his right-back place in the side to Micah Richards and Nedum Onuoha. Trabelsi did not play a game after City's 1–0 win at Newcastle United in March, and he was released at the end of the season.

International career
Trabelsi made his international debut for the Tunisia national team in May 1998, shortly before the 1998 World Cup. He also played in all of Tunisia's matches in the 2002 FIFA World Cup and 2006 FIFA World Cups, as well as the 2004 African Nations Cup, which Tunisia won. Following Tunisia's elimination from the 2006 World Cup after a 1–0 defeat to Ukraine, Trabelsi announced his retirement from international football at the age of 29, with 61 caps and one goal. He scored his only goal for the national team in 2006 in a friendly match against Ghana.

Style of play
Trabelsi was described as Tunisia's star player in the run-up to the 2006 World Cup. His strongest attributes are generally regarded to be his pace and his agility, though critics sometimes questioned his commitment.

Honours
CS Sfaxien
 CAF Cup: 1998
 UAFA Club Championship: 2000

Ajax
Eredivisie: 2001–02, 2003–04
KNVB Cup: 2001–02, 2005–06
Johan Cruijff Shield: 2002, 2005

Tunisia
 Africa Cup of Nations: 2004

Individual
 Officer of the National Order of Merit of Tunisia: 2003

References

External links

1977 births
Living people
Association football fullbacks
Tunisian footballers
CS Sfaxien players
AFC Ajax players
Manchester City F.C. players
Eredivisie players
Premier League players
Tunisia international footballers
1998 FIFA World Cup players
2002 FIFA World Cup players
2005 FIFA Confederations Cup players
2006 FIFA World Cup players
2000 African Cup of Nations players
2002 African Cup of Nations players
2004 African Cup of Nations players
2006 Africa Cup of Nations players
Tunisian expatriate footballers
Tunisian expatriate sportspeople in the Netherlands
Expatriate footballers in the Netherlands
Tunisian expatriate sportspeople in England
Expatriate footballers in England
People from Aryanah
People from Sfax